Kratky, Krátký (feminine form Krátká ) or Krátky (feminine form Krátka ) is a Czech (Krátký/Krátká) and Slovak (Krátky/Krátka) surname. It is derived either from the Czech word krátký or the Slovak word krátky for "short" and is also to be found in the Czech and Slovak diaspora.

People
 Alena Krátká (born 1946), Czechoslovak politician
 Andreas Kratky, German media artist
 Bernard Kratky, American horticulturist
 Břetislav Krátký (1911–1987), Czech sprinter
 Christoph Kratky (born 1946), Austrian chemist
 Fred Kratky (born 1942), American politician
 Josef Kratky (1907–1989), Austrian politician
 Marek Krátký (born 1993), Czech football player
 Michele Kratky (born 1957), American politician
 Otto Kratky (1902–1995), Austrian physicist
 Paul Kratka (born 1955), American actor
 Petr Krátký (born 1975), Czechoslovak rower
 Radovan Krátký (1921–1973), Czech writer and translator
 Robert Kratky (born 1973), Austrian presenter
 Rudolf Krátký (1919–2009), Czech actor

See also
 

Czech-language surnames
Slovak-language surnames
Surnames from nicknames